KMB Route 70 is a discontinued bus route operated from Jordan to Landmark North (Sheung Shui Bus Terminus), Sheung Shui. The route was run by Kowloon Motor Bus. The bus ran through Yau Ma Tei, Kowloon Tong, Sha Tin, CUHK, Tai Po and Fanling in the journey.

Service history
 1968
 The Route 19 (the previous number which this route was used) commenced on 27 January, after the opening of Lion Rock Tunnel.
 1970s
 The route was renumbered 70 on 16 July 1973.
 The route was diverted to Wang Tau Hom from 1974 (Only to Sheung Shui bound).
 1980s
 The route reverted to use Waterloo Road towards Lion Rock Tunnel from 13 January 1980.
 1990s
 The route was diverted to Tai Wo Bus Terminus from 17 February 1990.
 The route was diverted to Wan Tau Tong from 1 October 1992.
 Air-conditioned bus service was provided on the route from 13 January 1997.
 2000s
 The route had lost its function of servicing passengers from Kowloon West to Sheung Shui. Kowloon Motor Bus had tried to cancel the route, but the route was retained due to objections from the district chancellors and the citizens of Tai Po District.
 The Transport Department announced that Route 70 would be cancelled on 1 October 2008, but the plan was later halted. It was finally cancelled on 7 December 2008 in spite of objections from Tai Po District.

Fleet (as of November 2008)
Leyland Olympian 11m (non-air conditioned)
Volvo Olympian 11m (non-air conditioned)
Dennis Dragon 9.9/11m (air-conditioned)

Sources

070